"Oui" (sometimes stylized as "oui") is a song by American singer Jeremih from his third studio album, Late Nights (2015). The song was released on October 30, 2015 as the third single from the album. The original title for the song was "Oui (You and I)" but was altered before commercial release. The bridge interpolates the intro from "If I Ever Fall in Love" by Shai.

The song garnered a positive reception from critics who praised the production and vocal delivery of the lyrics. "Oui" peaked at number 19 on the Billboard Hot 100, giving Jeremih his fifth top 20 hit on that chart. It also charted at numbers 2 and 5 on both the Rhythmic and Hot R&B/Hip-Hop Songs charts respectively.

Critical reception
Meghan Garvey of Pitchfork Media gave the song its "Best New Music" accolade lauding Jeremih's vocal performance, "It’s not a fireworks display or a peak-hour dancefloor filler. You sink into it. Light some candles. Summon the oracle. Late Nights season approaches."

Natalie Weiner of Billboard wrote that Jeremih is "classic" and "crooning" in this song. Writing for the Uproxx, Aspektz called the song production "cloudy" and "lovesick", while Jeremih's vocals "classic".

Live performances
In November 2015, Jeremih performed "Oui" at the 2015 Soul Train Music Awards in Las Vegas, Nevada.

Usage in media
The song was used in an Apple TV commercial as Nikolaj Coster-Waldau tries to practice a kissing scene with Alison Brie in a trailer for a TV show. Felton said he was not amused by the use of the song in the commercial.

Charts

Weekly charts

Year-end charts

Certifications

References

External links
 

2015 singles
2015 songs
Jeremih songs
Def Jam Recordings singles
Songs written by Jeremih
Songs written by Needlz
Songs written by Brandon Bell (record producer)